3,4-Methylenedioxy-N-methylphentermine (MDMP or 3,4-methylenedioxy-α,α,N-trimethylphenethylamine) is a lesser-known psychedelic drug. MDMP was first synthesized by Alexander Shulgin. In his book PiHKAL, the minimum dosage is listed as 110 mg, and the duration is listed as approximately 6 hours. MDMP produces few to no effects, and is slightly similar to MDMA. Very little data exists about the pharmacological properties, metabolism, and toxicity of MDMP.

Legality

United Kingdom
This substance is a Class A drug in the Drugs controlled by the UK Misuse of Drugs Act.

See also 
 Phenethylamine
 Psychedelics, dissociatives and deliriants

References

Substituted amphetamines
Benzodioxoles
Entactogens and empathogens